The Madeiran chaffinch (Fringilla coelebs maderensis) is a small passerine bird in the finch family Fringillidae. It is a subspecies of the common chaffinch that is endemic to the Portuguese island of Madeira, part of Macaronesia in the North Atlantic Ocean.  It is locally known as the tentilhão.

Description
The male is more brightly coloured than the female. It has a pinkish breast, bluish-grey cap and greenish-brown back. The female's colouring is more subdued with a cream breast and brownish back, but both sexes have prominent white wing-bars and tail-sides.

Distribution and habitat
The chaffinch is found only on the island of Madeira, being absent from other islands in the Madeiran archipelago. It is widespread through the hills of the island, occupying both the native laurisilva forest and plantations of introduced trees, as well as in areas of heath, farmland and shrubland.

Behaviour

Breeding
The Madeiran chaffinch nests between April and July.  The female builds a cup-shaped nest lined with feathers in which she lays a clutch of four or five eggs and which she alone incubates for 12–15 days before they hatch.  The male helps to feed the chicks.

References

Notes

Sources
 

Birds described in 1888
Birds of Madeira
Endemic fauna of Madeira
Fringilla